Channel-inducing factor is a regulatory protein for aldosterone receptors.

See also
Chromosome 10 (human)
FXYD family

External links